The Secret of Pirates' Hill is Volume 36 in the original The Hardy Boys Mystery Stories published by Grosset & Dunlap.

This book was written for the Stratemeyer Syndicate by John Almquist in 1956. Between 1959 and 1973 the first 38 volumes of this series were systematically revised as part of a project directed by Harriet Adams, Edward Stratemeyer's daughter. The original version of this book was shortened in 1972 by Priscilla Baker-Carr resulting in two slightly different stories sharing the same title.

Plot summary
Hired by a mysterious businessman to locate an old Spanish cannon, the Hardy brothers and friends grow more and more suspicious as they encounter stolen cars and a mysterious man on a motorcycle.  They eventually uncover the cannon and thousands in gold bullion after perilous underwater adventures.

References

The Hardy Boys books
1957 American novels
1957 children's books
1972 American novels
1972 children's books
Grosset & Dunlap books